Otto Leskinen (born 6 February 1997) is a Finnish professional ice hockey player for the Laval Rocket of the American Hockey League (AHL) while under contract to the Montreal Canadiens of the National Hockey League (NHL). Leskinen has previously played in the Finnish league Liiga and Mestis, as well as in the Kontinental Hockey League (KHL).

Playing career
Leading up to the 2015 NHL Entry Draft, Leskinen was ranked 114th over all International Skaters by the NHL Central Scouting Bureau. While he went undrafted in North America, Leskinen signed a three-year contract extension with KalPa on 29 April 2015. He signed a two-year extension with KalPa on 21 November 2017.

In June 2018, Leskinen was invited to attend the Montreal Canadiens of the National Hockey League (NHL) training camp. In December 2018, Leskinen helped lead Kalpa to their first Spengler Cup Championship. He recorded one point during the tournament, an assist off captain Tommi Jokinen's goal in the semi-finals.

Leskinen had a break out season in the final year of his contract. He recorded a career-high 31 points, 23 assists, and 8 goals in 57 games during the 2018–19 season. As a result, Leskinen signed a two-year, entry-level contract with the Montreal Canadiens in May 2019. He was invited to their annual development camp in June that year and competed in their pre-season games. He made his NHL debut in a 3–2 defeat against the Colorado Avalanche on 5 December 2019. After playing five games for the Canadiens, Leskinen returned to the Laval Rocket for the remainder of the season.

On 4 August 2020, Leskinen was returned by the Canadiens on loan to former club, KalPa of the Liiga, to begin the 2020–21 season due to the delayed North American season as a consequence of the COVID-19 pandemic.

As a free agent from the Canadiens organization, Leskinen was signed by Finnish outfit, Jokerit of the KHL, agreeing to a two-year contract on 15 June 2021. After splitting time between the foregoing and Tappara of Liiga, Leskinen returned to the Canadiens organization via a one-year, two-way contract signed on 14 June 2022.

International play
Leskinen competed with the U18 Team Finland squad at the 2015 IIHF World U18 Championships, where he won a silver medal.

Leskinen was selected to try out for Team Finland ahead of the 2017 World Junior Ice Hockey Championships, but failed to make the final cut. In February 2019, Leskinen was selected to compete for Team Finland in the Euro Hockey Tour. He was later invited to tryout for Team Finland's World Championship team.

Player profile

Described as a smooth-skating, offensive defenceman, Leskinen was praised for his ability to help on a power play.

Personal life
He graduated from Vocational and Adult College of Savonia.

Career statistics

Regular season and playoffs

International

Awards and honours

References

External links 

1997 births
Living people
Finnish ice hockey defencemen
Iisalmen Peli-Karhut players
Jokerit players
KalPa players
Laval Rocket players
Montreal Canadiens players
People from Pieksämäki
Tappara players
Undrafted National Hockey League players
Sportspeople from South Savo